Vykintas Vaitkevičius is a Lithuanian archaeologist.

Vaitkevičius graduated from the Vilnius University (1996: B.S. history, specialty archaeology; 1998: M.S. history, specialty archaeology; 2000: doctorate in humanities)

His research interests include Baltic and ancient Lithuanian religion, comprehensive studies of Lithuania and Belarus, and digitization of cultural heritage.

Since 2010 he is Vilnius University. As of 2014 he is project leader at the museology chair, Department of Communication.

He is noted for popularization of the archaeology in the society. In particular, since 2002 he is an active organizer of the "Professor Marija Gimbutas Readings" co-organized by the National Museum of Lithuania and the Archaeological Society of Lithiuania. Since 2006 he is deputy chair of the  Archaeological Society of Lithiuania.

During 2001-2002 he was member of the state commission in archaeology at Seimas (Lithuanian parliament). During 2005-2010 he was on the Immovable Cultural Heritage Review Board of the Department of Cultural Heritage.

In 2011 he was recipient of the State Jonas Basanavičius Award for comprehensive research in ethnic Lithuanian lands.

Other awards include "Archaeologist of the Year" (2008) and recipient of the Baltoji gimtis ("Born Balt") award (2006).

Books
 Senosios Lietuvos šventvietės. Žemaitija, Vilnius: Diemedis, 1998, 
 Alkai: baltų šventviečių studija, Vilnius: Diemedis, 2003 m. 
 Studies into the Balts’ Sacred Places, Oxford: J. & E. Hedges Ltd, 2004  (British Archaeological Reports. International Series, vol. 1228)
 Senosios Lietuvos šventvietės. Aukštaitija, Vilnius: Diemedis, 2006 m. .
 Neris. 2007 metų ekspedicija. Pirma knyga, Vilnius: Mintis, 2010,

Co-authored
Ar tikrai Raigardas prasmego? Kompleksinių tyrimų duomenys, Vilnius: VDA leidykla, 2001, 
 Merkinės istorijos bruožai, Vilnius: Lietuvos istorijos instituto leidykla, 2004, 
 (with Valentinas Baltrūnas), Lietuva. 101 įdomiausia vieta.  Vilnius: Alma littera, 2008 m., 2010 m. 
 (with Daiva Vaitkevičienė) Lietuva. 101 legendinė vieta, Vilnius: Alma littera, 2011 m.

References

Lithuanian archaeologists
Year of birth missing (living people)
Living people